Giovanni Andrea Mones (1759-March 17, 1803) was an Italian painter and architect, active mainly in Casalmaggiore and Mantua.

Biography
He was born in Casalmaggiore, Italy. He was a pupil of the Abbot  Francesco Antonio Chiozzi in Casalmaggiore. He became a professor of architecture. He worked in Mantua, painting for the church of Sant'Andrea and for the Royal court, and in the Palazzo Guerrieri. He designed and decorated the Theater of Casalmaggiore. He painted a room in the Casino of Marchese Gherardini in Castelnuovo Reggiano. He also designed (1790) the Palazzo Pubblico of Casalmaggiore.

References

1759 births
1803 deaths
18th-century Italian painters
Italian male painters
19th-century Italian painters
18th-century Italian architects
Painters from Mantua
19th-century Italian architects
People from Casalmaggiore
19th-century Italian male artists
18th-century Italian male artists